Swingin' Down Broadway is a 1958 album by Jo Stafford and arranged by Paul Weston, released by Columbia Records. The album was re-released as Jo + Broadway by Corinthian Records in 1978.

Track listing
Side one

 "Love for Sale"
 "Happiness Is a Thing Called Joe" - 2:41
 "How High the Moon"
 "Speak Low" - 2:11
 "It Never Entered My Mind" - 2:35
 "Taking a Chance on Love" - 2:52

Side two

 "Anything Goes" - 2:42
 "The Gentleman Is a Dope" - 2:51
 "I Got it Bad"
 "Old Devil Moon" - 2:30
 "Any Place I Hang My Hat Is Home" - 3:37
 "Tomorrow Mountain"

References

1978 albums
Jo Stafford albums
Albums arranged by Paul Weston
Corinthian Records albums
Albums conducted by Paul Weston